Trpaslík (Gnome) is a Czech comedy television series. The first episode was available as a preview on the Czech Television website on December 28, 2016, and was premiered on television from January 2, 2017. It was filmed in Nymburk.

Cast
Michal Suchánek as Jarda Staněk
Marika Procházková as Katka Staňková
Petr Mähring ad Jakub Šorm as Luděk Staněk
Tereza Taliánová as Janička Staňková
Martin Hofmann as Vladimír Novotný
Milena Minichová as Pavlína Novotná
Jana Šulcová as Mrs. Janáčková
Petr Nárožný as Mr. Kutlák
Martin Evžen Kyšperský as Petr Šoural
Josef Abrhám as Václav Novotný
Martin Myšička as Karas
Nami Havelková as Jolanka Vanýsková
Elizaveta Maximová as Irena Korytářová
Ivana Lokajová as gravekeeper's wife
Michal Isteník as policeman
Alžběta Vaculčiaková as Jolana's best friend
Eva Leinweberová as teacher
Jiří Bábek as headmaster
Lukáš Bech as gravekeeper

External links
Website (in Czech)
IMDb.com

References 

Czech comedy television series
Czech fantasy television series
2017 Czech television series debuts
Czech Television original programming